The 35th PMPC Star Awards for Television honors the best in Philippine television programming from 2020 to 2021, 
as chosen by the Philippine Movie Press Club. The ceremony is held at the Winford Manila Resort and Casino on January 28, 2023. This is the first time in the history of the award-giving body that its skipped the 4th Quarter of the previous year. The ceremony is hosted by Pops Fernandez, Aiko Melendez and John Estrada.

The nominations were announced by the Press on January 15, 2023.

Winners and Nominees

Winners are listed first and highlighted in bold:

Networks

Programs

Personalities

Special Awards

Ading Fernando Lifetime Achievement Award
Connie Angeles

Excellence in Broadcasting Lifetime Achievement Award
Raffy Tulfo

German Moreno Power Tandem Award
Kelvin Miranda and Mikee Quintos
Donny Pangilinan and Belle Mariano

Stars of the Night
Paolo Ballesteros (Male)
Pops Fernandez (Female)

Winning Looks of the Night
John Estrada (Male)
Aiko Melendez (Female)

Faces of the Night
John Estrada (Male)
Pops Fernandez (Female)

Celebrities of the Night
JM de Guzman (Male)
Aiko Melendez (Female)

Special Citation
Jojo Flores
Maricar Moina

Most major nominations

Most major wins

Performers
Lani Misalucha
Kris Lawrence
Joaquin Garcia
JV Decena
Kuh Ledesma

References

See also 
PMPC Star Awards for TV
2021 in Philippine television

PMPC Star Awards for Television
2021 in Philippine television